Robert Hartig (born: Heinrich Julius Adolph Robert Hartig, 30 May 1839, in Braunschweig – died 9 October 1901, in Munich) was a German forestry scientist and mycologist. He has been called the father of forest pathology.

Biography 
He was educated at the Collegium Carolinum of Braunschweig, and at Berlin. In 1878, he was appointed professor of botany at Munich. Hartig made significant contributions to knowledge of vegetable pathology. Prior to his investigations on the progressive stages of disease in trees, little or nothing had been done in this area, so that Hartig may be considered the founder of arboreal pathology.

Hartig worked in Eberswalde (1867–1878) and Munich (1878–1901), mainly in forest pathology.

Works 
 Vergleichende Untersuchungen über den Wachsthumsgang und Ertrag der Rothbuche und Eiche im Spessart, der Rothbuche im östlichen Wesergebirge, der Kiefer in Pommern und der Weißtanne im Schwarzwalde, Stuttgart 1865.
 Die Rentabilität der Fichtennutzholz- und Buchenbrennholzwirthschaft im Harze und im Wesergebirge. Stuttgart 1868.
 Wichtige Krankheiten der Waldbäume. Beiträge zur Mycologie und Phytopathologie für Botaniker und Forstmänner, Berlin, 1874.
 Die durch Pilze erzeugten Krankheiten der Waldbäume. Für den deutschen Förster. Zweite Auflage. Breslau: Morgenstern, 1875.
 Die Zersetzungserscheinungen des Holzes der Nadelholzbäume und der Eiche in forstlicher botanischer und chemischer Richtung, Berlin, 1878. (Initiated the modern era of understanding of wood decay.)
 Lehrbuch der Baumkrankheiten, Berlin, 1882.
 Lehrbuch der Baumkrankheiten, 2., verb. und vermehrte Auflage, Berlin, 1889.
 2nd ed. translated into English by William Somerville and H. Marshall Ward as Diseases of Trees, London 1894
 Lehrbuch der Pflanzenkrankheiten. Für Botaniker, Forstleute, Landwirthe und Gärtner, 3., völlig neu bearbeitete Auflage des Lehrbuches der Baumkrankheiten, Berlin 1900.
 Das Holz der deutschen Nadelwaldbäume, Berlin, 1885.
 Der ächte Hausschwamm (Merulius lacrymans Fr.), (Die Zerstörungen des Bauholzes durch Pilze I), Berlin 1885.
 2nd ed.: Der echte Hausschwamm und andere das Bauholz zerstörende Pilze, 2. Aufl., bearbeitet und herausgegeben von Dr. C. Freiherr von Tubeuf, Berlin, 1902.
 (with Rudolf Weber) Das Holz der Rothbuche in anatomisch-physiologischer, chemischer und forstlicher Richtung, Berlin 1888.
 Lehrbuch der Anatomie und Physiologie der Pflanzen unter besonderer Berücksichtigung der Forstgewächse, Berlin, 1891.
 Die anatomischen Unterscheidungsmerkmale der wichtigeren in Deutschland wachsenden Hölzer, 4. Auflage, München 1898.

Family 
He was the son of Theodor Hartig (1805–1880) and grandson of Georg Ludwig Hartig (1764–1837).

See also 
 Compartmentalization of decay in trees (CODIT)
 Robert Hart (horticulturist) who specialized in forest gardening.

References 

German mycologists
1839 births
1901 deaths
Scientists from Braunschweig
People from the Duchy of Brunswick
German foresters
Technical University of Braunschweig alumni
Academic staff of the Eberswalde University for Sustainable Development